Ottens is a surname. Notable people with the surname include:

Brad Ottens (born 1980), Australian rules football player, brother of Luke
Lou Ottens (1926–2021), Dutch engineer and inventor
Luke Ottens (born 1976), Australian rules football player, brother of Brad

See also
Otten